Diospyros keningauensis is a tree in the family Ebenaceae. Inflorescences bear up to five flowers. The tree is named for Keningau in Malaysia's Sabah state. D. keningauensis is endemic to Borneo and confined to Sabah.

References

keningauensis
Endemic flora of Borneo
Trees of Borneo
Flora of Sabah
Plants described in 2001